Dumb Luck (Số đỏ) is a 1936 novel by the famous Vietnamese novelist, Vũ Trọng Phụng. The novel served as an contemporary critique on the Vietnamese late colonial society by the means of satirizing the rising bourgeoisie. The main character of the story, Red-haired Xuân, himself was a part of the lower class of society, was able to work his way up through the social ladder, quickly associating with the upper class connections and individuals through cunning works; all thanks to the, then popular, Westernization social movement among the Hanoian petite bourgeoisie class in the 1920s. A movement which was portrayed as immoral and stand in stark contrast to existing Vietnamese moral foundations by Vũ Trọng Phụng.

Số Đỏ, among many other works of Vũ Trọng Phụng was banned by the Vietnamese Communist Party, first in North Vietnam from 1960 to 1975, then throughout the unified Socialist Republic of Vietnam until 1986, due to the author's realistic description of sexual content which was considered unsuitable.
Until now, the book "Dumb Luck" was re-published in Vietnam. At the same time, an abridged version is also included in the literature curriculum for Vietnamese high schools.

Due to the complexities of the plot and the nature of the novel; Most, if not all of the main characters of this novel are antagonists.

An English translation was published by the University of Michigan Press in 2002. A German translation was published by Tauland-Verlag.

References

External links 
University of Michigan Press publicity page

1936 novels
Satirical novels
Vietnamese novels
Novels set in Hanoi
University of Michigan Press books